Vincent Gordon Burke Cushing (born 17 January 1950) is an English former first-class cricketer.

Cushing was born at Chichester in January 1950. He later studied at Oriel College at the University of Oxford. While studying at Oxford, Cushing played first-class cricket for Oxford University, making his debut against Yorkshire at Oxford in 1971. He played first-class cricket for Oxford until 1973, making fourteen appearances. He scored a total of 565 runs in these matches, at an average of 28.25 and with a high score of 77 not out. Cushing also made a single appearance in List A cricket for Oxford University in the 1973 Benson & Hedges Cup against Warwickshire, though he was not called upon to bat.

References

External links

1950 births
Living people
People from Chichester
Alumni of Oriel College, Oxford
English cricketers
Oxford University cricketers